KSEK may refer to:

 KSEK (AM), a radio station (1340 AM) licensed to Pittsburg, Kansas, United States
 KSEK-FM, a radio station (99.1 FM) licensed to Girard, Kansas, United States